Marty Simpson may refer to:

 Marty Simpson (baseball), 19th-century baseball player
 Marty Simpson, contestant on season 5 of Australian Idol
 Marty Simpson (comedian) (born 1972), American comedian and actor